Raymond Francis Putterill (born 3 February 1989 in the Wirral) is an English footballer, who is currently unattached to a club.

Club career

Liverpool
Putterill started his career at Liverpool working his way through their youth teams and moving up to the Liverpool Academy in the summer of 2005. In April 2007 he was in the team that lifted the 2007 FA Youth Cup for Liverpool. He was given a senior contract in the summer of 2007 and made one first team appearance against Crewe Alexandra in pre-season during July 2007 in a friendly match, when he scored. He was awarded the number 35 shirt at Liverpool for the 2007–08 season and was named on the bench for the first time in a Football League Cup tie against Reading in September 2007. He was unable to break into the first team and failure to prove his fitness after a hip operation resulted in his release from Liverpool at the end of the 2008–09 season.

His nickname is 'Razor' both in relation to his 1st name 'Ray' and also his aggressive playing style much like former Liverpool player 'Razor Ruddock'.

Halewood Town
He joined Liverpool County Premier League team Halewood Town around October 2009, playing between 15 and 20 games for the side.

Accrington Stanley
After seven operations throughout his career including a fractured spine, a hip reconstruction, cartilage in his knee, a hernia operation and a fractured spine when playing for England Schoolboys, the under 15s, against Ireland, in July 2010 he signed for League two club Accrington Stanley on a six-month contract. He made his league debut on 7 August 2010 in the opening match of the season against Aldershot and scored his first goal for the club on 25 August 2010 in a League Cup tie against Newcastle United.

In September 2010, both Putterill and Accrington Stanley were charged by the Football Association after the midfielder played whilst under a 42-day Liverpool County FA suspension. This related to an incident whilst playing for Halewood in April 2010 where he had been found guilty of improper or insulting behaviour, after swearing at the referee. The ban came into effect from 30 August 2010 and it was thought that playing Putterill may lead to Stanley being expelled from the Football League Trophy. On 13 October 2010 Stanley withdrew from the competition and Tranmere were reinstated. He returned from this ban in a League Two match on 16 October 2010 as a late substitute in Stanley's match against Rotherham.

Though no official announcement was made, his fitness levels were a concern and as a result he was not offered a contract by Accrington Stanley for the 2011–12 season.

Southport

On his 23rd birthday, Putterill signed for Conference National team Southport In just his second match for the club he was sent off for foul and abusive language.

On his return from suspension he joined Vauxhall Motors on loan until the end of the season, but failed to make a single first team appearance.

Rochdale

On 9 August Putterill signed for League 2 Team Rochdale on a non-contract basis. He scored his first Football League goal on 25 August. On 14 January 2013 Ray Putterill was released by the club along with fellow Dale player Ian Craney.

Hyde

On 22 January 2013 Putterill signed a permanent deal with Conference Premier team Hyde. He was released at the end of his contract after making only one first-team appearance.

Waterloo Dock
He then played for Waterloo Dock.

Formby

Over the summer of 2013 he signed for North West Counties Football League Division One side Formby, making his debut in the opening game of the season.

Marine
In February 2016 he joined Marine making two league appearances for the club.

Honours

FA Youth Cup: 2007 with Liverpool

Career statistics

References

External links

Ray Putterill England stats at The Football Association

1989 births
Living people
English footballers
Association football midfielders
Liverpool F.C. players
Accrington Stanley F.C. players
English Football League players
England youth international footballers
Southport F.C. players
Vauxhall Motors F.C. players
Rochdale A.F.C. players
National League (English football) players
Northern Premier League players
Formby F.C. players
Hyde United F.C. players
Marine F.C. players
Waterloo Dock A.F.C. players